The 1832 Pennsylvania gubernatorial election occurred on October 9, 1832. Incumbent Governor George Wolf, a Democrat, defeated Anti-Masonic candidate Joseph Ritner to win re-election.

Results

References

1832
Pennsylvania
Gubernatorial
November 1832 events